Guzeh Lengeh (also Romanized as Gūzeh Lengeh; also known as Gūzal Lengeh) is a village in Rahimabad Rural District, Rahimabad District, Rudsar County, Gilan Province, Iran. At the 2006 census, its population was 37, in 8 families.

References 

Populated places in Rudsar County